André Alexandre Carreira Sousa (born 9 July 1990) is a Portuguese professional footballer who plays as a midfielder for U.D. Vilafranquense.

Club career
Born in Moita, Setúbal District, Sousa played youth football for three clubs, including Sporting CP from ages 13 to 17. He made his senior debut in the third division, first with Odivelas F.C. then F.C. Pampilhosa.

Sousa moved to the Primeira Liga on 26 July 2011, after signing a three-year contract with S.C. Beira-Mar. He was immediately loaned to S.C. Covilhã from the Segunda Liga, making his competitive debut on by starting and being sent off at the hour mark of a 4−0 home win against Caldas S.C. in the second round of the Taça de Portugal.

Returned to the Estádio Mário Duarte for 2012−13, Sousa's first match in the Portuguese top flight took place on 22 September 2012, coming on as a second-half substitute in a 4−0 away loss to FC Porto. It was only one of four league appearances during the season, which ended in relegation.

During the 2015 January transfer window, and with Beira-Mar immerse in a severe financial crisis − soon being relegated to the Aveiro regional championships− Sousa left as a free agent and joined division two team Académico de Viseu FC. He returned to the top tier in the ensuing off-season, signing with C.F. Os Belenenses.

In his debut campaign with his new club, Sousa made 40 appearances in all competitions and scored two goals. His first in the domestic league occurred on 27 September 2015, in a 2−2 draw at F.C. Arouca.

Sousa agreed to a season-long loan at Sporting de Gijón from Spain on 4 July 2018.

International career
Sousa won two caps for the Portuguese under-21 team, both in 2011. His first arrived on 31 May, when he played 14 minutes in a 4−2 friendly win over Germany in Portimão.

References

External links

1990 births
Living people
People from Moita
Sportspeople from Setúbal District
Portuguese footballers
Association football midfielders
Primeira Liga players
Liga Portugal 2 players
Segunda Divisão players
Odivelas F.C. players
FC Pampilhosa players
S.C. Beira-Mar players
S.C. Covilhã players
Académico de Viseu F.C. players
C.F. Os Belenenses players
Belenenses SAD players
U.D. Vilafranquense players
Segunda División players
Sporting de Gijón players
Süper Lig players
TFF First League players
Gaziantep F.K. footballers
Manisa FK footballers
Portugal under-21 international footballers
Portuguese expatriate footballers
Expatriate footballers in Spain
Expatriate footballers in Turkey
Portuguese expatriate sportspeople in Spain
Portuguese expatriate sportspeople in Turkey